Alberta is an unincorporated community in Wilcox County, Alabama, United States.

The community has the name of Alberta Bush, the wife of a railroad official.

Geography

Demographics

Alberta Census Division (1960-)

Alberta has never reported separately as an unincorporated community on the U.S. Census. However, the census division for the northernmost part of Wilcox County was named for Alberta when it was created in 1960. The census-designated places (CDPs) of Boykin and Catherine are located within the Alberta census division. Since 1960 to 2010, it has reported a Black majority in the division.

Climate
The climate in this area is characterized by hot, humid summers and generally mild to cool winters.  According to the Köppen Climate Classification system, Alberta has a humid subtropical climate, abbreviated "Cfa" on climate maps.

Notable people
 Marie Foster, leader in the Civil Rights Movement during the 1960s.
 Joseph Smitherman, mayor of Selma, Alabama for 35 years.

References

Unincorporated communities in Alabama
Unincorporated communities in Wilcox County, Alabama